Gerald Ernest Heal Abraham,  (9 March 1904 – 18 March 1988) was an English-Jewish musicologist, editor and music critic. He was particularly respected as an authority on Russian music.

Early career and author
Abraham was born at Newport, Isle of Wight, and initially trained for a naval career in nearby Portsmouth until ill-health forced a change of direction. He was largely self-taught in piano, music theory and history, aside for some practical orchestration experience with military bands and a year's study in Cologne, where he learned German and listened to much music.

In 1927, aged just 23 he published his first music book, a study of Alexander Borodin, though he later disowned it. There followed contributions to music periodicals and monographs on Nietzsche  (1933),  Tolstoy (1935), and  Dostoevsky (1936). Abraham taught himself Russian and began a series of analytical articles on Russian music, collected in Studies in Russian Music (1935) and On  Russian  Music (1939). In collaboration with M D Calvocoressi he also wrote Masters  of  Russian Music (1936). Other works on Russian music include Eight Soviet Composers (1943), Tchaikovsky (a symposia, as editor, 1945), and his completion of both Calvocoressi's Mussorgsky (Master Musicians series, 1946) and his larger study Modest Mussorgsky: His Life and Works (1956).

But Abraham's interests ranged beyond the slavonic, as first shown in his introduction to contemporary music, This Modern Stuff (1933, later re-titled This Modern Music) and in A Hundred Years of Music (1938) covering the broader history of music from the death of Beethoven. He also edited collections of articles on Chopin (1939), Schubert (1946), Sibelius (1947), Grieg (1948), Schumann (1952), and Handel (1954). Slavonic and Romantic Music: Essays and Studies (1968) and Essays on Russian and East European Music (1985) collect some of his best work.

The BBC and academia
In  1935  Abraham was appointed by the BBC as assistant editor of the Radio Times (1935–39) where he worked with his friend Ralph Hill, then as Deputy Editor of The Listener (1939-1942, and subsequently as music editor until 1962). He was Gramophone Department Director from 1942 until 1947, an important post during wartime when the BBC's broadcasting of live music was severely restricted. This led to his participation in the founding of the Third Programme in 1946. Then he left the BBC for fifteen years to become the inaugural James and Constance Alsop Professor of Music at Liverpool University. He returned to the BBC in 1962 to become Assistant Controller of Music, a post he held for five years. He moved to the USA in 1968 for a year as Ernest Bloch Professor of Music at the University of California at Berkeley. His lectures from this time were published as The Tradition of Western  Music (1974).

Histories and encyclopedias
A project that spanned three decades was the New Oxford History of Music, for which Abraham acted as secretary to the editorial board. He personally edited five of the ten volumes (see list below). The first (Vol. III, Ars Nova and the Renaissance, in collaboration with Dom Anselm Hughes) came out in 1960 and the last (Vol, IX, Romanticism (1830-1890) was published posthumously in 1990. He also oversaw its audio supplement, The History of Music in Sound, a series of gramophone recordings and handbooks, first launched in 1953. His synoptic overview, the Concise Oxford  History  of  Music, came out in 1979 during this period, and he was also involved in the 20-volume New  Grove  Dictionary  of  Music and  Musicians (1980).

Other appointments
From 1958-1961, he served as the president of the International Society for Music Education, and later would go onto serve as the president of the British Royal Music Association (1970-1974) and the Royal Musical Association (1970–74). Additionally, he served numerous other positions in both ceremonial and official statuses, including: 
 Chairman, Music Section of the Critics' Circle, 1944–46
 Editor, The Monthly Musical Record, 1945–60
 Founding editor, BBC Music Guides, 1966-1974
 Music critic, The Daily Telegraph, 1967–68
 Editor, Music of the Masters (book series)
 Chairman, Early English Church Music Committee, 1970–80
 Member, Editorial Committee, Musica Britannica
 President, International Society for Music Education, 1958–61
 Deputy Chairman, Haydn Institute (Cologne), 1961–68

Personal life
In 1936 he married (Isobel) Pat Robinson. They had one daughter, Frances, and lived for many years in Hampstead (at 106 Frognal, Walter Besant's old house), where they held many hospitable "open evenings" of music. Later they returned to the Isle of Wight (to the village of Brighstone), and from the early 1960s to the Old School House, Ebernoe, near Petworth in Sussex. He was made a CBE in 1974. Abraham died at the King Edward VII Hospital, Midhurst, on 18 March 1988, aged 84. In the Musical Times Alec Hyatt King remembered him as "unforgettable...burly of stature and with a rumbustious sense of humour: seldom did he come off second best". David Brown called him "perhaps the greatest of those "amateurs" so profoundly important in English musical scholarship".

Publications
 This Modern Stuff, 1933
 Nietzsche, 1933
 Studies in Russian Music, 1935
 Tolstoy, 1935
 Masters of Russian Music (with Michel Dimitri Calvocoressi), 1936
 Dostoevsky, 1936
 A Hundred Years of Music, 1938
 On Russian Music, 1939
 Chopin's Musical Style, 1939
 Beethoven's Second-Period Quartets, 1942
 Eight Soviet Composers, 1943
 Tchaikovsky: a symposium 1945
 Rimsky-Korsakov: a symposium 1945
 Sibelius: a symposium 1947
 Grieg: a symposium 1948
 Schubert: a symposium 1952
 Design in Music, 1949
 Schumann: a symposium 1952
 Handel: a symposium 1954
 Slavonic and Romantic Music, 1968
 The Tradition of Western Music, 1974
 The Master Musicians: Mussorgsky (with Michel Dimitri Calvocoressi), 1974
 The Concise Oxford History of Music, 1979
 Essays on Russian and East European Music, 1984
 New Oxford History of Music (as editor):
 Vol. III (Ars Nova and the Renaissance), 1960
 Vol. IV (The Age of Humanism), 1968
 Vol. VI (Concert Music: 1630-1750), 1985
 Vol. VIII (The Age of Beethoven), 1982
 Vol, IX (Romanticism (1830-1890), 1990

References

External links
 Trowell, Brian. Gerald Abraham, Proceedings of the British Academy, 2001

1904 births
1988 deaths
20th-century British musicologists
Academics of the University of Liverpool
BBC music executives
Commanders of the Order of the British Empire
English Jews
English musicologists
Fellows of the British Academy
University of California, Berkeley College of Letters and Science faculty
BBC Radio 3